One Last Thing may refer to:

 "One Last Thing" (Homeland), episode of the American television series Homeland
 One Last Thing (film), 2018 American film
 One Last Thing..., 2005 American film